Anna-Lena Grönefeld and Petra Martić were the defending champions, but both chose not to participate.

Alexandra Panova and Urszula Radwańska won the title defeating Katalin Marosi and Renata Voráčová in the final 7–5, 4–6, [10–6].

Seeds

Draw

Draw

References
 Main Draw

Open GDF Suez de Cagnes-sur-Mer Alpes-Maritimes - Doubles